The 16787 / 16788 Ten Jammu Express is a weekly train running between the stations Shri Mata Vaishno Devi Katra, in Jammu and Kashmir, and Tirunelveli Junction, in Tamil Nadu. It travels through 13 states in India, with a total of 64 stops.

See also
Vivek Express
Himsagar Express
Kerala Express

References

Named passenger trains of India
Transport in Tirunelveli
Transport in Katra, Jammu and Kashmir
Rail transport in Tamil Nadu
Rail transport in Andhra Pradesh
Rail transport in Telangana
Rail transport in Maharashtra
Rail transport in Uttar Pradesh
Rail transport in Madhya Pradesh
Rail transport in Rajasthan
Rail transport in Haryana
Rail transport in Delhi
Rail transport in Punjab, India
Rail transport in Jammu and Kashmir
Express trains in India